This is a list of journals published by Nature Research. These include the flagship Nature journal, the Nature Reviews series (which absorbed the former Nature Clinical Practice series in 2009), the npj series, Scientific Reports and many others.

List

A

B

C

E

G

H

I

J

L

M

N

Nature Reviews series

npj series
The Nature Partner Journals series, abbreviated npj, is a series of online-only, open access, journals. It was launched in April 2014 with three journals: npj Primary Care Respiratory Medicine, npj Biofilms and Microbiomes, and npj Schizophrenia. Each journal in the series is published through a partnership between Springer Nature and a separate academic organization, foundation, or institution.

O

P

S

T

References

External links
List of journals on Nature.com
List of formerly published journals

Nature Research